Erfurter Landkurier ('Erfurt Country Courier') was a newspaper published from Erfurt, German Democratic Republic 1960-1961. Publishing began in December 1960. In 1961 the newspaper was succeeded by Erfurter Wochenzeitung.

References

Mass media in Erfurt
Newspapers established in 1960
Publications disestablished in 1961
Socialist Unity Party of Germany
German-language communist newspapers
Former state media